Shaadi may refer to:

 A Shaadi is the generic term for an Indian or Pakistani wedding
 Shaadi.com, an Indian matrimonial website
 Shaadi (1962 film), a 1962 Indian film
 Shaadi (1941 film), a 1941 Bollywood film
 Shaadi (horse)